Clivina postica is a species of ground beetle in the subfamily Scaritinae. It was described by John Lawrence LeConte in 1848.

References

postica
Beetles described in 1848